Juan Omedes (20 November 1927 – 20 February 1967) was a Spanish rower. He competed at the 1948 Summer Olympics and the 1952 Summer Olympics.

References

1927 births
1967 deaths
Spanish male rowers
Olympic rowers of Spain
Rowers at the 1948 Summer Olympics
Rowers at the 1952 Summer Olympics
Rowers from Barcelona